Raid Jahid Fahmi (born 1950) is an Iraqi politician and economist who served as Iraq's Minister of Science and Technology in the government of Nouri al-Maliki, from 2006 to 2010.

Biography
He is of Arab origin born in Baghdad. His father was a lawyer and a civil servant in the Iraqi foreign Ministry and held posts in Lebanon and Switzerland in the late 1950s and early 1960s. He has spent most of his life in exile. He is a graduate of the London School of Economics, Queen Mary, University of London and the Paris Sorbonne University and has worked as a researcher for the Industrial Bank of Kuwait, the OECD. He taught and gave lectures in  educational and academic institutions in France  and was the Iraqi Communist Party's representative in France. He edited the Al-Thaqafah al-Jadidah magazine.

The ICP contested the Iraqi legislative election of December 2005 as part of the Iraqi National List coalition, and in May 2006, Raid Fahmi was appointed Minister of Science and Technology in al-Maliki's government of national unity.

In August 2007, he was appointed head of the Commission on the Normalisation of the Status of Kirkuk.
ICP contested the Iraqi legislative election of Mai 2018 as part of list Sairoon Alliance. Raid Fahmi was elected as member of the Council of Representative of Iraq (COR) and took charge of his office on September 3rd 2018.
Raid Fahmi announced his resignation from the Iraqi Parliament on the 27th of October 2019 in solidarity with the popular protest movement and in protest against the lack of effective action from the legislative power to put an end to the use of violence against the demonstrators by the security and other non official armed groups. 
He is married and a father of four children.

References

1951 births
Living people
Alumni of the London School of Economics
Alumni of Queen Mary University of London
University of Paris alumni
People from Baghdad
Iraqi Communist Party politicians
Government ministers of Iraq
Iraqi expatriates in Lebanon
Iraqi expatriates in Switzerland
Iraqi expatriates in France
Iraqi expatriates in the United Kingdom